Christine Rosemary Payne (née Charters; born 19 May 1933) is a British female discus thrower. She represented Great Britain at the 1972 Summer Olympics in Munich and won the gold medal for Scotland at the 1970 Commonwealth Games. She was born in Kelso, Scottish Borders, Scotland She now competes under the name Rosemary Chrimes.

She had previously competed at the international level back to the 1958 British Empire and Commonwealth Games.

She married hammer thrower and three-time Olympian Howard Payne (1931–1992), and has affiliated with the Lozells Harriers during her career.

At the age of 39 she competed in the 1972 Olympics. She ranked tenth in the qualification round with a distance of 55.56 m, in the final she finished 12th with a throw of 56.50 meters. Her personal best of 58.02 m dates from the same year 1972.

At age 41, she took a silver medal in the 1974 Commonwealth Games.  Also in 1974, she served as the British Junior Team Manager, supervising youngsters including Steve Cram, Fatima Whitbread, Colin Jackson and Steve Backley.

She competed in the 1975 World Masters Athletics Championships, showing her athletic versatility by winning gold in not only the Discus and shot put throwing events, but also in the 100 metres and high jump.

After 1978, she took a break from competing, to return ten years later at the European Veterans Championships, adding the triple jump to her repertoire.  Her British W55 record of 9.12 m still stands.  In all she has amassed 19 British age group records, including a complete sweep of Discus records from age 35 to 80, excepting the W50 division that fell during the years she was not competing. As of the start of 2014, she holds five world records.

References

 sports-reference

1933 births
Living people
Scottish female discus throwers
Athletes (track and field) at the 1972 Summer Olympics
Olympic athletes of Great Britain
British female discus throwers
World record holders in masters athletics
British masters athletes
Commonwealth Games medallists in athletics
Commonwealth Games gold medallists for Scotland
Athletes (track and field) at the 1958 British Empire and Commonwealth Games
Athletes (track and field) at the 1970 British Commonwealth Games
Athletes (track and field) at the 1974 British Commonwealth Games
Commonwealth Games silver medallists for Scotland
Medallists at the 1970 British Commonwealth Games
Medallists at the 1974 British Commonwealth Games